Ruff Driverz were the aliases of British DJ / remixers Brad Carter and Chris Brown. The duo also recorded under the names 2000BC and Transit.

In the late 1990s, the duo scored six dance hits in the UK. Two of these were also major successes on the Billboard Hot Dance Club Play chart in the United States, where they were released on Tommy Boy Records. The flamenco-inspired "Dreaming" (featuring Katherine "Arrola" Ellis and credited as "Ruff Driverz Presents Arrola"), a Top Ten hit on the UK Singles Chart, peaked at #20 in the United States, and "Waiting For The Sun," which was their highest charting record, peaked at #2.

Carter continues as a solo producer and remixer. Brown continues to organise, promote and book for events and festivals in the UK and Europe. The act reunited in 2019 for a brief show with Ellis.

Singles Discography

References

British dance music groups
British electronic music groups
Remixers